Karl Marx (Russian: Азард) was the lead ship of her class of five destroyers built for the Russian Imperial Navy during the 1910s. Completed during 1916, she served with the Baltic Fleet during the remainder of the First World War, and after the October Revolution joined the Bolshevik Red Fleet. She was active during the Russian Civil War, taking part in several engagements against British ships during the British campaign in the Baltic. The destroyer was renamed Karl Marx (Russian: Зиновьев) in 1922. She played a small role in the Winter War with the Soviet Baltic Fleet when Germany invaded the Soviet Union in 1941 (Operation Barbarossa), and was sunk by German aircraft on 8 August 1941.

Design and description
Ordered from Böcker and Lange's shipyard in Reval, Estonia, in the 1912 naval program, the Izyaslav-class destroyers were improved versions of the preceding  with a heavier armament.

Bibliography 

 

 

 

Destroyers of the Imperial Russian Navy
Ships built in Russia
1914 ships
World War I destroyers of Russia
 
Destroyers of the Soviet Navy